The Matt Winn Stakes is a Grade III American Thoroughbred horse race for three-year-old horses run over a distance of  miles on the dirt at Churchill Downs in Louisville, Kentucky. The event currently offers a purse of $225,000. It is usually run in mid-June but in 2020 was moved up to mid-May.

History

The race was inaugurated in 2002 in honor Kentucky Derby and Churchill Downs's Col. Matt Winn, who served as president and general manager of the historic track from 1902 to 1949. Known by the media as "Mr. Derby," Winn is credited with building the Kentucky Derby into America's greatest race and one of the world's great sports events. The inaugural running was over a distance of six furlongs. 

In 2009 the distance was set at 7 furlongs. In 2011, it was changed to its current  miles.

In 2011 the event was upgraded to Grade III status.

In 2020 as a result of the coronavirus pandemic, the event was rescheduled to May 23 from its normal date in mid-June. The race was added to the 2020 Road to the Kentucky Derby as a result of the rescheduling of that race.

Records
Speed Record: (at current distance of  miles)
 1:41.12 – Gun Runner (2016)

Margins: 
  lengths – Neck 'n Neck  (2012)

Most wins by a jockey
 3 – Florent Geroux (2016, 2021, 2022)

Most wins by a trainer
 5 – Steve Asmussen (2003, 2005, 2010, 2014, 2016)

Most wins by an Owner
 2 – Winchell Thoroughbreds (2014, 2016)

Winners

References

See also
List of American and Canadian Graded races

Graded stakes races in the United States
Grade 3 stakes races in the United States
Flat horse races for three-year-olds
Churchill Downs horse races
2002 establishments in Kentucky
Recurring sporting events established in 2002